Hanna Griffiths is an actor, producer and filmmaker from Melbourne, Australia. She studied at the Victorian College of the Arts. Selected as a "Ones To Watch" by Screen Producers Australia.  Recognised by Women in Film as the "Breakout Producer" and by Pinewood Studios as a "Best Female Filmmaker" for her work in independent filmmaking.

Early life 
Griffiths began acting as a teenager in theatre productions and starred with Olivia Newton-John in a series of Nintendo television commercials. She worked alongside Newton-John at the Liv Aid foundation and at the ONJ Cancer Research Foundation. Griffiths trained and competed in Equestrian Dressage events and competed at the Garryowen, held at the Royal Melbourne Show. Her family own a 870-hectare property in East Gippsland, named Giffard, and is situated down McGauran's Beach Road.

Career 
Griffiths began acting at age 13 she started with school plays and theatre groups. She studied at the Victorian College of the Arts in Melbourne, Victoria. Griffiths starred in Underbelly as Jodie. She also starred in Rush and feature film Evil Never Dies, alongside Katherine Heigl. Griffiths was selected as a "Ones To Watch" announced by Screen Producers Australia. The high calibre of diverse and exciting applications to the Ones To Watch program continues to impress and serve as proof that the screen industry is brimming with talent and creativity unique to Australia, and that Australian culture and stories will continue to delight global audiences in the future. Hanna has acquired the rights to adapt award-winning novels and extraordinary life stories and is developing projects offering key opportunities for First Australians and visionary artists to cultivate new stratospheres of storytelling.

Angels In The Sky 
Angels in the Sky is a television series based on the Amazon best selling novel. About the creation of the Israeli Air-force based on the true story of Mitchell Flint.  Alongside producer Mark Damon, Griffiths will executive produce with DCR Finance Fund as primary financial backer.

Awards and nominations 
 2020: Nominated for the Heartland International Film Festival Best Film for The Sinners 
 2020: Winner Catalina International Film Festival Best Film for The Sinners
 2020: Nominated Leo Awards Best Motion Picture The Sinners
 2020: Winner Catalina International Film Festival Best Film for The Sinners
 2020: Winner Canadian Cinematography Awards Best Feature Film for The Sinners
 2020: Nominated Fantaspoa International Fantastic Film Festival Best Film for The Sinners
 2020: Nominated FrightFest Best International Film for The Sinners
 2020: Nominated for the Mammoth Film Festival Best Film for The Sinners
 2019: Winner Los Angeles Cinematography Awards Best Cinematography for The Sinners

Charity, philanthropy and honours 
Griffiths was featured in the #12WOMEN Campaign for UNICEF promoting International Women's Day for ERTH Jewelry. She hosted the 2018 Hollywood Pal Foundation in association with the Los Angeles Police Department and Paramount Pictures. In 2009, she raised funds to help build the Olivia Newton-John Cancer and Wellness Centre in Melbourne, Australia.

References

External links
 
 

Living people
Actresses from Melbourne
Australian film producers
Australian film actresses
UNICEF Goodwill Ambassadors
Australian television producers
Australian women television producers
Australian women film producers
Australian expatriates in the United States
21st-century Australian actresses
Australian women ambassadors
International women's organizations
Year of birth missing (living people)